Les Deux Magots is a famous café and restaurant situated at 6, Place Saint-Germain-des-Prés in Paris's 6th arrondissement, France. It once had a reputation as the rendezvous of the literary and intellectual elite of the city. It is now a popular tourist destination. Its historical reputation is derived from the patronage of Surrealist artists, intellectuals to the likes of Simone de Beauvoir and Jean-Paul Sartre, as well as young writers, such as Ernest Hemingway. Other patrons included Albert Camus, Pablo Picasso, James Joyce, Bertolt Brecht, Julia Child and the American writers James Baldwin, Chester Himes and Richard Wright.

The Deux Magots literary prize (Prix des Deux Magots) has been awarded to a French novel every year since 1933 at Les Deux Magots.

Origin of the name
"Magot" literally means "stocky figurine from the Far East". The name originally belonged to a fabric and novelty shop at nearby 23 Rue de Buci. The shop sold silk lingerie and took its name from a popular play of the moment (19th century) entitled Les Deux Magots de la Chine. Its two statues represent Chinese "mandarins", or "magicians" (or "alchemists"), who gaze out over the room. In 1873, the business moved to its current location in the Place Saint-Germain-des-Prés. In 1884, the business changed to a café and liquoriste, but kept the name.

Auguste Boulay bought the business in 1914, when it was on the brink of bankruptcy, for 400,000 francs. The present manager, Catherine Mathivat, is his great-great-granddaughter.

References in literature and popular culture

In literature 
 Les Deux Magots appears in The Chariot Makers, by Steve Matchett, in which the author describes Les Deux Magots as: "the first café in the quarter to be blessed by the morning sun. Its clientele pay a healthy premium for drinking there, it’s only fitting they should be the first to catch the warmth of the new day."
 The café figures prominently in Abha Dawesar's novel That Summer in Paris (2006).
 The café is the setting for a pivotal scene in the 1998 novel The Magic Circle by Katherine Neville. The novel was displayed for several months in the windows of Les Deux Magots.
 In the 2009 novel El hombre que amaba a los perros (The Man who Loved Dogs) by Leonardo Padura it is one of the places where Trotsky's assassin, Ramon Mercader, spends time while waiting to be sent to Mexico to complete his assignment.
 The café features prominently in Marco Missiroli's Atti osceni in luogo privato, about the early life of "Libero Marsell", whose father will be a patron of the cafè and will befriend writer Albert Camus before the author's death.
 The café is the site of an important event in China Miéville's novella The Last Days of New Paris (2016).
”Lolita,” chapter 5, part 1.
A Moveable Feast, chapter 8 by Ernest Hemingway.

In graphic novels 
 A café with a similar name (Café Deux Magots) is seen in the fictional town of Morioh, Japan in Diamond is Unbreakable, the fourth part of JoJo's Bizarre Adventure.

In art 
 1959 color photograph by Saul Leiter.
 1967 figurative painting by Jean-François Debord.

In film 
 Several scenes in the 1949 movie The Man on the Eiffel Tower take place here.
 The café features in Jean Eustache's 1973 film La Maman et la Putain  (The Mother and the Whore).
 The café features in the 2011 film The Intouchables, in a scene in which Philippe (François Cluzet) and Driss (Omar Sy) stop there after a wee-hours stroll along the Seine, meant to ease Philippe's suffering in the middle of the night.

In television 
 The café features in a scene in the final episode of NBC sitcom The Good Place.
 The café is shown while filmed in a week-long tour in Paris of The Late Late Show with Craig Ferguson during  June, 2011.

In music 
 The café features centrally as the main location of the tale told in the song “A Rose Is A Rose” by singer Poe, with many of the café‘s more famous clientele name-checked in the lyrics, each enraptured with the enigmatic Jezebel.

In podcasts 
 Cocoa from Les Deux Magots is featured heavily in The Amelia Project.

See also

 Café de Flore
 Place Jean-Paul-Sartre-et-Simone-de-Beauvoir
 List of bakery cafés

Footnotes

External links

 Les Deux Magots official site
 List of Deux Magots literary prize winners since 1933

Restaurants in Paris
Buildings and structures in the 6th arrondissement of Paris
Bakery cafés
Simone de Beauvoir
Coffeehouses and cafés in Paris
Restaurants established in 1884
1884 establishments in France